Novochishma (Yañı Şişmä) is a rural locality (a village) in Lipovsky Selsoviet, Arkhangelsky District, Bashkortostan, Russia. The population was 166 as of 2010. There are 2 streets.

Geography 
Novochishma is located 25 km north of Arkhangelskoye (the district's administrative centre) by road. Novye Sarty is the nearest rural locality.

References 

Rural localities in Arkhangelsky District